Volto may refer to:
 Volto (mask), or larva, a type of Venetian mask worn at the Carnival of Venice
 Volto!, an American jazz rock jam band